Boll Weevil was a casual dining chain of hamburger restaurants located in San Diego, California, United States.

History
Boll Weevil was founded in 1966 by Fred and Lorraine Halleman. The original location was adjacent to the upscale Cotton Patch steakhouse, with the Boll Weevil name referring to a smaller restaurant spawned from a cotton patch. Both were located in San Diego on Midway Drive, near Barnett Ave and Pacific Highway in Point Loma. In the first Boll Weevil restaurant, beef left over from the trimmings of prime steak prepared at the Cotton Patch steakhouse were used to prepare burgers. Because of the success of the chain of Boll Weevil restaurants, the Cotton Patch eventually closed. Entrepreneur Fred Halleman assisted in establishing 20 Boll Weevil restaurants across the country. On September 15, 2008, the company-owned restaurants were closed down as the parent company entered Chapter 7 bankruptcy. A few independently owned franchise stores remain open.

As of July 2017, the website representing the remaining locations (which are independently owned) lists five stores still operating.

Decor
Boll Weevil restaurants were decorated in a style reminiscent of the American Old West, and also featured pool tables and video games.

Reception 
While discussing Hodad's, OB Rag editor Frank Gormlie criticized the food served at Boll-Weevil's as being too greasy. San Diego Reader editor Ben Kers included Boll Weevil in his list of "fourteen more things you’ll never see in San Diego again". He said that while there are still a few restaurants bearing the name, he felt that the food was no longer the same as it once was.

See also

 List of hamburger restaurants

References

External links
 Boll Weevil Locations

Restaurants established in 1966
Hamburger restaurants
Regional restaurant chains in the United States
Companies based in San Diego
Restaurants in San Diego County, California
Privately held companies based in California
Defunct restaurant chains in the United States
1966 establishments in California